Jorge do Vale de Araújo, better known as Jorge Mauá (born 22 January 1987), is a Brazilian striker who currently plays for amateur club Metropolitano de Nova Veneza. He's among the all-time top scorers for Mauaense, his hometown club.

Profile
Jorge Mauá started his career playing futsal for Corinthians, scoring more than 250 goals as a forward. At age 21, Mauá made the switch to association football, playing for União Suzano and Colegiales from Paraguay without much success. He kept playing in amateur leagues in Mauá until 2013, when he got offered a contract by local team Mauaense. He led the team in scoring during his tenure and quickly got promoted to upper-division teams such as Nacional and Taubaté. Jorge Mauá played for Atlético Cajazeirense in the 2018 Campeonato Paraibano.

In 2016, he returned to his hometown club and once again led the team in scoring, netting one goal per game on average. The stats caught the attention of Juventus da Mooca, but the striker had a disappointing 2017 Série A-2 run, scoring only two goals. A year later, he managed to regain his form playing for Noroeste, in the Campeonato Paulista Série A3.

After his contract with Noroeste expired, he came back to the amateur leagues while majoring in Physical Education.

Jorge Mauá returned to professional football in 2022, signing for União Suzano of the Campeonato Paulista Série A3. He scored a brace in his debut on 29 January, a 2–1 win against São José.

References

External links
 Jorge Mauá at playmakerstats.com (English version of ogol.com.br)

1988 births
Living people
Brazilian footballers
Association football forwards
Atlético Cajazeirense de Desportos players
Esporte Clube Noroeste players
Clube Atlético Juventus players
Associação Desportiva São Caetano players
Esporte Clube Taubaté players
Nacional Atlético Clube (SP) players
Footballers from São Paulo
União Suzano Atlético Clube players